Holiya may refer to :-

 A town named Holiya in Nepal - Holiya, Nepal
 An ethnic group of India called - Holiya (caste)
 A language of India - Holiya language